Haliburton Water Aerodrome  was located  southwest of Haliburton, Ontario, Canada.

It was located on Kashagawigamog Lake by Wigimog Inn on the north shore of the lake.

See also
Haliburton/Stanhope Municipal Airport

References

Defunct seaplane bases in Ontario